Gary Wayne Shaw (born 13 February 1959) is a former Australian rules footballer who played for Collingwood and the Brisbane Bears in the Victorian Football League (VFL) during the 1980s.

Queenslander Gary Shaw started at Queensland Australian Football League (QAFL) club Western Districts before moving west to Western Australian Football League (WAFL) club Claremont where he was a premiership player in 1981. In the Grand Final he shared the Simpson Medal with Maurice Rioli of South Fremantle. A 'Best and Fairest' winner in 1982, Shaw represented Western Australia at interstate football.

Shaw, an on baller, crossed to Collingwood in 1983 but struggled to make an impact. He had his best season in 1984 when he kicked 21 goals and took part in their finals campaign. His stint at Brisbane was also unsuccessful.

References

Holmesby, Russell and Main, Jim (2007). The Encyclopedia of AFL Footballers. 7th ed. Melbourne: Bas Publishing.

1959 births
Living people
Collingwood Football Club players
Brisbane Bears players
Claremont Football Club players
Western Magpies Australian Football Club players
Australian rules footballers from Queensland